Vladimir Vuković (born 16 March 1989) is a former professional footballer who played as a midfielder. Born in Bosnia-Herzegovina, he played for the country and Canada at youth level.

Club career
In his youth career Vuković played for FK Borac Banja Luka and OFK Belgrade. In December 2010 he signed for the Swedish Division 1 Norra club Bodens BK before joining German NRW-Liga side Hamborn 07 in summer 2012. After the failed playing licence for Hamborn, left the club in Winter of 2012 and returned to Canada.

International career
Vuković was part of the Bosnia U17 national team in the European Cup qualifying in 2004 after deciding to play for the Canadian U20. He made his debut for Canada on 12 May 2008, against Argentina U20 in Toronto.

References

External links
 
 

Living people
1989 births
Canadian people of Serbian descent
Canadian people of Montenegrin descent
Canadian soccer players
Association football midfielders